Engada Iruthinga Ivvalavu Naala is a 2021 Tamil language romantic comedy film directed by Kevin and starring Akhil and Ishara Nair in the lead roles. Produced by Thilaka Arts, it was released on 26 March 2021.

Cast

Production 
Kevin made his directorial debut with the film, twenty years after trying to break into the film industry. The film began production in early 2016 and Akhil was cast in the lead role. Four actresses were signed on to star in the film - Ishara Nair, Manishajith, Sahana and Krishnapriya. Rajendran was signed on to portray a film financier in the film, while Yogi Babu also shot for extra scenes. The technical crew included experienced editor Suresh Urs and stunt director Super Subbarayan.

In June 2016, Ishara Nair complained that Kevin had subject her to sexual harassment in the sets of the film. She added that the director had wasted her dates, while also making unwelcome advances during the shoot.

Throughout 2020, Kevin tried to find distributors to release the film through an over-the-top media service but the lack of high-profile actors in the film meant that there were no takers.

Release 
The film was released theatrically across Tamil Nadu on 26 March 2021. A critic from Maalaimalar gave the film a mixed review, citing it lacked excitement.

References

External links 
 

2021 films
2020s Tamil-language films
Indian romance films
Indian romantic comedy films
Films shot in Chennai
2021 directorial debut films